Melanella amblia is a species of sea snail, a marine gastropod mollusk in the family Eulimidae. The species is one of a number within the genus Melanella.

References

External links
 

amblia
Gastropods described in 1883